Renata Baierová is a former competitive figure skater who represented Czechoslovakia. She is the 1979 Ennia Challenge Cup champion, 1979 Prague Skate silver medalist, and 1979 Prize of Moscow News bronze medalist. She competed at six ISU Championships, finishing in the top ten at the 1976 Junior Worlds in Megève and 1980 Europeans in Gothenburg.

Baierová finished 16th at the World Championships in 1979 and 1980. She trained at TJ Stadion Brno. Her coach was Karol Divín.

Competitive highlights

References 

Czechoslovak female single skaters
Living people
Figure skaters from Brno
Year of birth missing (living people)